Sunlight Sena was a caste army formed by Rajputs and Upper-Caste Muslims in Bihar to take on the ultra-Left wing groups of Communist Party of India (Marxist–Leninist) Liberation and the Maoist Communist Centre and their Dalit supporters. Its primary aim was to protect the vast stretches of land owned by feudal elements from these two social groups. The founder leaders of the Sena were two Rajput feudal lords – Ranjit Singh of Raniganj and Vinod Singh of Bisrampur, but later on, they handed over the leadership to the Muslim feudal lords, the Pathans or Khans. According to police records, however, the Sunlight Sena was brought into existence by the Muslim landlords in Dumharia village of the Gaya district of Bihar. Shaney Ali is said to be the founder leader in these records. It is also claimed that the activities of Sena later expanded to Palamu region of Jharkhand too. The date of its launch is said to be 1987.

History
The Upper Caste Muslims have enjoyed comfortable relationships with the feudal elements of the Hindu society particularly the Rajputs and the Bhumihar landlords. Over the years, Pathans and Rajputs have enjoyed good relationship. The Upper Caste Muslims thus cultivated an alliance with these social groups among Hindus and targeted the Backward Castes among Muslims like Ansaris, Qureshis and Mansuris.

References

Private armies
Far-right politics in India
Paramilitary organisations based in India
Caste-related violence in India
Anti-communist terrorism
Non-military counterinsurgency organizations
Indigenous counterinsurgency forces
Anti-communism in India
1987 establishments in Bihar
Military units and formations established in 1987
Caste-related violence in Bihar
Rajput clans of Bihar
Muslim communities of Bihar